Bread and Roses was a socialist women's liberation collective active in Boston in the 1960s and 1970s.The group is named after the slogan of the 1912 Lawrence textile strike.

History
The collective was founded in the summer of 1969 by Meredith Tax and Linda Gordon.The group included Jean Tepperman, Frans Ansley, Judy Ullman and Trude Bennett.The organization lasted til 1973.

References

Bibliography 

 
 
 
 

Women's organizations based in the United States
Feminist organizations in the United States
Organizations based in Boston
History of women in Massachusetts